John Huo Cheng (1 February 1926 – 2 January 2023) was a Chinese Roman Catholic bishop.

Life
Bishop Huo was born in 1926. After practicing Taoism, he joined the theological seminary and on 14 May 1954 was ordained a priest. During the Cultural Revolution, he was detained and sent to a labour camp, where he spent time from 1966 until his release in 1980. He was consecrated as a diocesan bishop of Fenyang on 4 September 1991 and was recognised both by the Holy See and by the Chinese government.

References

1926 births
2023 deaths
People from Shanxi
20th-century Roman Catholic bishops in China
21st-century Roman Catholic bishops in China
Bishops appointed by Pope John Paul II
Chinese prisoners and detainees
Prisoners and detainees of the People's Republic of China